Abarema turbinata is a species of plant in the family Fabaceae. It is found only along the coastal Atlantic Forest and restingas in Bahia, Brazil.

References

turbinata
Endemic flora of Brazil
Vulnerable plants
Taxonomy articles created by Polbot